FK Mandalskameratene is a Norwegian football club, from the town of Mandal in Vest-Agder, currently playing in the 3. divisjon. The club was founded on 1 July 1912, under the name of 'Alladin'. In 1918 the club changed its name to 'Mandalskameratene'.

History
Results have varied over the years. Making it to the 3rd round of the cup in 1964 was until recently the club's greatest achievement. As recently as the late 80s Mandalskameratene played in the 5th level of the Norwegian league system. Then a period of steady advancement started, and in 2000 the team was promoted to the First Division. They have since played several seasons in the First Division, but spent the 2002 and 2006 seasons in the Second Division, and were again relegated in 2007. In 2009, the club was relegated to the Third Division. In the 2010 season, it won all its 26 league matches in the Agder section of the Third Division. It played off against Skarphedin for promotion to the Second Division, and won promotion after losing 2-0 away but winning 6-0 at home.

Recent history 
{|class="wikitable"
|-bgcolor="#efefef"
! Season
! 
! Pos.
! Pl.
! W
! D
! L
! GS
! GA
! P
!Cup
!Notes
|-
|2000
|2. divisjon
|align=right bgcolor=#DDFFDD| 1
|align=right|22||align=right|16||align=right|2||align=right|4
|align=right|71||align=right|28||align=right|50
|2nd round
|Promoted
|-
|2001
|1. divisjon
|align=right bgcolor=#FFCCCC| 13
|align=right|30||align=right|9||align=right|5||align=right|16
|align=right|49||align=right|62||align=right|32
|2nd round
|Relegated
|-
|2002
|2. divisjon
|align=right bgcolor=#DDFFDD| 1
|align=right|26||align=right|18||align=right|7||align=right|1
|align=right|69||align=right|19||align=right|61
|3rd round
|Promoted
|-
|2003
|1. divisjon
|align=right |7
|align=right|30||align=right|14||align=right|7||align=right|9
|align=right|57||align=right|51||align=right|49
|4th round
|
|-
|2004
|1. divisjon
|align=right |5
|align=right|30||align=right|13||align=right|6||align=right|11
|align=right|51||align=right|55||align=right|45
|4th round
|
|-
|2005
|1. divisjon
|align=right bgcolor=#FFCCCC| 13
|align=right|30||align=right|7||align=right|8||align=right|15
|align=right|41||align=right|54||align=right|29
|3rd round
|Relegated
|-
|2006
|2. divisjon
|align=right bgcolor=#DDFFDD| 1
|align=right|26||align=right|20||align=right|3||align=right|3
|align=right|75||align=right|24||align=right|63
|4th round
|Promoted
|-
|2007
|1. divisjon
|align=right bgcolor=#FFCCCC| 16
|align=right|30||align=right|4||align=right|7||align=right|19
|align=right|43||align=right|92||align=right|19
|2nd round
|Relegated
|-
|2008
|2. divisjon
|align=right |4
|align=right|26||align=right|12||align=right|3||align=right|11
|align=right|60||align=right|46||align=right|39
||2nd round
|
|-
|2009
|2. divisjon
|align=right bgcolor=#FFCCCC| 13
|align=right|26||align=right|6||align=right|4||align=right|16
|align=right|33||align=right|60||align=right|22
||1st round
|Relegated
|-
|2010
|3. divisjon
|align=right bgcolor=#DDFFDD| 1
|align=right|26||align=right|26||align=right|0||align=right|0
|align=right|106||align=right|17||align=right|78
||2nd round
|Promoted
|-
|2011 
|2. divisjon
|align=right |10
|align=right|26||align=right|8||align=right|7||align=right|11
|align=right|45||align=right|59||align=right|31
||2nd round
|
|-
|2012 
|2. divisjon
|align=right bgcolor=#FFCCCC| 13
|align=right|26||align=right|6||align=right|6||align=right|14
|align=right|46||align=right|73||align=right|24
|1st round
|Relegated
|-
|2013 
|3. divisjon
|align=right |5
|align=right|26||align=right|11||align=right|3||align=right|10
|align=right|40||align=right|36||align=right|36
|1st qualifying round
|
|-
|2014 
|3. divisjon
|align=right |9
|align=right|26||align=right|9||align=right|5||align=right|12
|align=right|51||align=right|46||align=right|32
|1st qualifying round
|
|-
|2015 
|3. divisjon
|align=right |8
|align=right|26||align=right|8||align=right|8||align=right|10
|align=right|52||align=right|54||align=right|32
|1st qualifying round
|
|-
|2016 
|3. divisjon
|align=right bgcolor=#FFCCCC| 8
|align=right|24||align=right|11||align=right|1||align=right|12
|align=right|50||align=right|50||align=right|34
|2nd qualifying round
|Relegated
|-
|2017 
|4. divisjon
|align=right |6
|align=right|24||align=right|10||align=right|7||align=right|7
|align=right|61||align=right|41||align=right|37
|1st qualifying round
|
|-
|2018 
|4. divisjon
|align=right bgcolor=#DDFFDD| 1
|align=right|26||align=right|14||align=right|7||align=right|5
|align=right|69||align=right|43||align=right|49
|2nd qualifying round
|Promoted
|-
|2019 
|3. divisjon
|align=right |2
|align=right|26||align=right|16||align=right|5||align=right|5
|align=right|68||align=right|43||align=right|53
|1st qualifying round
|
|-
|2020
|colspan="11"|Season cancelled
|-
|2021
|3. divisjon
|align=right |11
|align=right|13||align=right|4||align=right|4||align=right|5
|align=right|27||align=right|22||align=right|16
|1st round
|
|-
|2022
|3. divisjon
|align=right |11
|align=right|26||align=right|7||align=right|6||align=right|13
|align=right|52||align=right|59||align=right|27
|1st qualifying round
|
|}
Source:

References

External links

Association football clubs established in 1912
Football clubs in Norway
Sport in Vest-Agder
Mandal, Norway
1912 establishments in Norway